Jörg M. Colberg (born 15 February 1968) is a German writer, educator and photographer, living in Northampton, Massachusetts, USA. He is the founder and editor of Conscientious, a blog dedicated to contemporary fine-art photography. He worked as a research scientist in astronomy and has been a professor of photography at the Hartford Art School.

Life and work
Colberg studied physics and astronomy at the University of Bonn; he earned a Ph.D. in physics (theoretical cosmology) at the Max Planck Institute for Astrophysics. He moved to the United States in 2000. After a short and unsatisfying experience in the computer programming industry. Colberg returned as a postdoc at the University of Pittsburgh.

He discusses and dissects contemporary fine art photography on his blog, Conscientious, started in 2002. In 2009 Source included Conscientious in its list of ten recommended photography blogs; in 2010 Wired said that "Joerg Colberg is a pioneer in photography blogging, and his blog Conscientious maintains a tight editorial voice"; and in 2012 Sean O'Hagan included it among his few most recommended online photography websites and publications.

In 2006 American Photo named Colberg one of their Photography Innovators.

Colberg is the author of Understanding Photobooks: The Form and Content of the Photographic Book (2016), a guide to making photobooks. He has contributed essays to photography publications, including Foam Magazine, British Journal of Photography, and Creative Review. He has written introductory essays for photography monographs, guest-edited photography exhibitions and photobooks.

Along with Andrés Marroquín Winkelmann, he was a founder of the short-lived photobook publishing company Meier & Müller.

From 2010, Colberg was a faculty member of the Hartford Art School.  he was living in Northampton, Massachusetts.

In the photobook Vaterland (2020), Colberg reflects on the rise of anti-immigrant racism and xenophobia in Germany, "which he believes is not being taken seriously enough", with right-wing ideology having become normalised. It was described in the British Journal of Photography that Colberg achieves this through "an atmosphere of uneasiness. [. . .] There is little contrast between black and white. [. . .] Each picture frames a lingering uncertainty; something out of place. [. . .] The images work together to create a mood of angst." He made the images in Berlin, Hamburg and Warsaw.

Publications

Publications by Colberg
Linking cluster formation to large scale structure. Max Planck Institute for Astrophysics, 1997. .
Peculiar velocities of galaxy clusters. Munich: Max Planck Institute for Astrophysics, 1998. .
At the Edge of the Known World (According to Google Street View). Self-published.
Understanding Photobooks: the Form and Content of the Photographic Book. London: Focal, 2016. Hardback, ; paperback, .
Photography's Neoliberal Realism. Discourse 4. London: Mack, 2020. .
Vaterland. Bielefeld, Germany: Kerber, 2020. . Text in English, German and Polish.

Publications with contributions by Colberg
Image Makers, Image Takers: the essential guide to photography by those in the know. New York: Thames & Hudson, 2010. By Anne-Celine Jaeger. . Second expanded edition.
Conditions by Andrés Marroquín Winkelmann, Meier & Müller, 2010. Edition of 300 copies. Edited by Adam Barto. Co-published and with an introductory essay by Colberg.
Observed. London: Ivorypress, 2013. . Sixth volume of C Photo. Guest edited by Colberg. 
2013 project. Caf́é Royal, 2013. . Includes texts by Colberg, Craig Atkinson, Sarah Bodman and Lawrence Zeegen.
Ostkreuz 25 Jahre. Ostfildern, Germany: Hatje Cantz, 2015. Edited by "Ostkreuz" (photo agency). . With a foreword by Wolfgang Kil and essays by Colberg and Laura Benz. Text in German, English and French.
Tim Richmond: Last Best Hiding Place. Heidelberg: Kehrer, 2015. Edited by Tim Richmond and Lee C. Wallick. . With an essay by Colberg.

Awards
2011: Life.com picked Conscientious for its Photo Blog Awards.

References

External links

Conscientious Photography Magazine
"Masters Series: Jörg M. Colberg, Krakow Photomonth 2016" (video) – Colberg giving a presentation, "Photography Online in 2016: What does any of it mean?", on the importance of understanding photographs because photographs play an important role for communication on the Internet

Living people
1968 births
German expatriates in the United States
German astrophysicists
Photography critics
Photography academics
Photography websites
University of Bonn alumni
University of Hartford faculty
University of Pittsburgh fellows